Woolly milkweed may refer to several species of plants:

Woolly milkweed, Asclepias lanuginosa, native to the upper Midwest United States and Canada
Woolly milkweed, Asclepias vestita, endemic to California, United States
Woolly pod milkweed, Asclepias eriocarpa, native to the southwest United States and northwest Mexico